Radučić is a village in Šibenik-Knin County, Croatia. It is part of the municipality of Ervenik.

References

Populated places in Šibenik-Knin County